1,000 Grams, Vol. 1 is a mix-tape by the rap artist Jeezy hosted by DJ Scream. It was released on August 12, 2010.

Background
The mixtape has Jeezy rapping over samples of some of the most popular hip hop beats of 2010.
The first track to be leaked from 1,000 Grams, was "Death B4 Dishonor", in which Jeezy samples Rick Ross' hit single "B.M.F. (Blowin' Money Fast)". On the track, Jeezy appears to be criticising Rick Ross by saying "How you blowin' money fast, you don't know the crew / Oh you're part of the fam, shit I never knew." However, in an interview with MTV, Jeezy claimed it was not a criticism and that the line was not aimed at anyone in particular. DJ Scream hosts this mixtape and has many tags on it; a tagless (or no DJ) version of the mixtape has also been released. This is volume one of what appeared to be a new series by Jeezy, but so far there have been no official statements on when volume 2 will be released.

Critical reception

Pitchfork's Tom Breihan wrote that the mixtape "seems to exist to support his opening salvo against Ross. And judging by the respective quality of both this tape and Ross' great new Teflon Don, Jeezy is heading for a big L here." David Malitz of The Washington Post called Jeezy's rhymes "cheaply glorifying" and the backing tracks "predictable".
Sam Hockley-Smith of The Fader said that while most mixtapes in which the artist raps over other people's songs consist of "watered down versions of the original" tracks, Jeezy on this mixtape is "always stable. Never really varying in tempo too much, just working with any beat that gets thrown his way. It’s a pretty sweet example of why this guy has outlasted a lot of his peers."

Track listing
All songs performed by Jeezy.

References

External links

Jeezy compilation albums
2010 mixtape albums
Albums produced by Cool & Dre
Albums produced by The Legendary Traxster